It Must Be Him is an album by Ray Conniff and The Singers. It was released in 1967 on the Columbia label (catalog no. CS-9595).

The album debuted on Billboard magazine's "Top LPs" chart on March 30, 1968, peaked at No. 25, and remained on that chart for 13 weeks. It was certified by the RIAA as a gold record.

AllMusic later gave the album a rating of three stars. Reviewer William Ruhlmann called it "a fairly typical collection of easy listening interpretations of pop hits from 1965-1967 that had been fairly easy to listen to in their original recordings."

Track listing
Side 1
 "Music to Watch Girls By" (Sid Ramin, Tony Velona)
 "Yesterday" (John Lennon, Paul McCartney)
 "Somethin' Stupid" (C. Carson Parks)
 "It Must Be Him" (Gilbert Bécaud, Mack David)
 "A Man and a Woman" (Francis Lai, Pierre Barouh)

Side 2
 "Release Me" (Eddie Miller, Robert Yount, W.S. Stevenson)
 "There's a Kind of Hush (All Over The World)" (Geoff Stephens, Les Reed)
 "What the World Needs Now Is Love" (Hal David, Burt Bacharach)
 "Don't Sleep in the Subway" (Jackie Trent, Tony Hatch)
 "Up, Up and Away" (Jimmy Webb)
 "The Impossible Dream" (from Man of La Mancha) (Mitch Leigh, Joe Darion)

References

1967 albums
Columbia Records albums
Ray Conniff albums